Sanal Kumar Sasidharan (born 8 April 1977) is an Indian poet, lawyer, and filmmaker.

Personal life
Sanal Kumar Sasidharan was born in Perumkadavila village, Thiruvananthapuram district, Kerala on 8 April 1977. He graduated in Zoology from VTM NSS College Dhanuvachapuram, Trivandrum and law, then started his job as a lawyer. He was associated with Akhil Bharatiya Vidyarthi Parishad (ABVP), a student organization associated with the Bharatiya Janata Party, and was the unit secretary of the ABVP during his days at the Law College. He later left ABVP over political differences, and became a critic of the BJP-controlled Central government. In 2001, he formed a film society, Kazhcha Chalachithra Vedi with his colleagues, for making independent movies through crowd funding. He has started his film making journey by directing three short films and one feature film through crowdfunding. Later on, he directed six more critically acclaimed feature films and a documentary.  He was awarded the Best Director in the Kerala State Film Awards 2014. He was awarded the Tiger Award in the International Film Festival Rotterdam for his film Sexy Durga.

Film career
His film career started in 2000 as an Art Assistant in the Malayalam film Mankolangal. After that he made his first short movie Wonder world in 2001. The cinematography was by Sunny Joseph and editing by Beena Paul. The short fiction was produced by Kazhcha Chalachithra Vedi by way of crowd funding. There was a long gap after his first short movie. In 2008 he directed Parole produced by a group of friends from Malayalam blog community. His third short film Frog, won a Kerala State Television Award for best short film in 2008. In 2014 Kazhcha Chalachithra Vedi produced his first feature-length movie Oraalppokkam for which he had been awarded the Best Director. The film has got fipresci and Network for the Promotion of Asian Cinema awards for the best Malayalam film in the International Film Festival of Kerala 2014. He has also bagged the Kerala State Film Award for Best Director in 2014. His second movie Ozhivudivasathe Kali (An Off-Day Game), which was completed in 2015 has been officially selected to International Film Festival of Kerala and Mumbai Film Festival. It has also bagged the Kerala State Film Awards for best film in 2015. The film was in the Film Basar Recommends in the Film Basar in Goa.

International recognition 
His 2017 film Sexy Durga, later renamed as S Durga following a controversy regarding the title and a ban by Central Board of Film Certification in India, has received Hivos Tiger Award in International Film Festival Rotterdam 2017. Sexy Durga is the first ever Indian film win this award. The film, cinematographed by Prathap Joseph also has won eight more international awards including the Award for Professional Achievement in the Tarkovsky Film Festival in Russia for the excellence in cinematography, the Golden Apricot Award in the International Feature Competition category in Yerevan International Film Festival 2017, Best International Feature Narrative in Guanajuato International Film Festival, Mexico Expresión en Corto International Film Festival 2017, Best International Feature award Reflet d’Or in the Geneva International Film Festival, The Young Jury award and a Special mention from the official Jury in the 53rd Pesaro Film Festival in Italy, Jury Mention for Direction and Original Music track in Cinema Jove - International Film Festival of Valencia, Spain, Special Jury mention in the 19th Mumbai Academy of Moving Image (MAMI). The work in progress project of the film had also received NFDC FILM BAZAAR – DI Award 2016. The film had to face huge controversy with regard to its title and made headlines following the Ministry of Information and Broadcasting (India) has denied the permission to screen the film in the International Film Festival of India after the Jury selection.

His next feature after Sexy Durga, Unmadiyude Maranam produced in 2018 has not been censored and released. The film also has not been screened in any major film festivals.

His next feature film Chola has been premiered in the 76th Venice International Film Festival in the Orizzonti Competition section. The main actors, Nimisha Sajayan has received the Kerala State Film Award for Best Actress and actor Joju George has won the Kerala State Film Award for Best Character Actor and Kerala State Film Award – Special Mention for Direction and Sound design to Sanal Kumar Sasidharan.

His latest feature film project Ah'r (Kayattam), announced in 2019 has been noted for the presence of acclaimed Malayalam actress Manju Warrier as protagonist and a co-producer.

Filmography

Awards
 Hivos Tiger Award International Film Festival Rotterdam in 2017
 Golden Apricot Award Yerevan International Film Festival in 2017
 Award for the Best International Feature in the Expresión en Corto International Film Festival/Guanajuato International Film Festival, Mexico 
Disruptor Award Indian Film Festival of Melbourne in 2021 
 Jury Mention For Direction in Valencia International Film Festival Cinema Jove in 2017 
Kerala State Film Award for Best Film in the 2015 Kerala State Film Awards
Best Director award in the 2014 Kerala State Film Awards
Special Jury award in the John Abraham Awards 2014
Special Jury mention in the Aravindan Puraskaram 2014
Mohan Raghavan award Best director 2014

References

External links
 
 Official Website
 Fipresci Profile
 Kiff2014 profile

Malayalam film directors
1977 births
Living people
Film directors from Thiruvananthapuram
21st-century Indian film directors